Argyrokastro ( Silver Castle) may refer to:

Argyrokastro Castle, castle in the region of the Peloponnese, Greece
Argyrokastro, the Greek name of Gjirokastër, a city in southern Albania
Argyrokastro Castle, or Gjirokastër Castle, a castle in Gjirokastër, southern Albania